Game box may refer to:

 A package of a game
 Video game packaging